This is a list of notable people who are ufologists (UFO researchers).

Argentina 

 Juan Posadas, (1912–1981), Trotskyist theorist who blended together Trotskyism and Ufology. Posadas' version of Trotskyism is regarded as its own strain, and called Posadism.
 Fabio Zerpa, (1928–2019), parapsychologist and UFO researcher.

Brazil 

 Ademar José Gevaerd (b. 1962)

Canada 

 Paul Hellyer, (1923–2021), Canadian Defense Minister.
 Stanton Friedman, (1934–2019), U.S. born Canadian ufologist, former nuclear physicist, did early research on Roswell and also MJ-12 documents.

Estonia 

 Igor Volke (b. 1950), ufologist and researcher of environmental anomalies

France 

 Jacques Bergier (1912–1978), writer, co-wrote the best-seller The Morning of the Magicians.
 Rémy Chauvin (1913–2009), biologist and entomologist.
 Robert Charroux (1909–1978), writer, promoted the Ancient astronauts theory.
 Aimé Michel (1919–1992), writer and ufologist.
 Jacques Vallée (b. 1939) computer scientist and author, important figure in the UFO studies in France and in the United States. Promoted the extraterrestrial hypothesis and later the interdimensional hypothesis.

Indonesia 

 J. Salatun, (1927–2012), pioneer of UFO research in Indonesia.

Italy 

 Monsignor Corrado Balducci, (1923–2008), Roman Catholic theologian of the Vatican Curia long time exorcist for the Archdiocese of Rome.

Mexico 

 Jaime Maussan, (b. 1953), Mexican journalist and ufologist.

Romania 

 Dan Apostol
 Doru Davidovici
 Ion Hobana

Spain 

 Iker Jiménez Elizari (b. 1973), journalist born in the Basque city of Vitoria. He's licensed in Sciences of the Information by the Complutensian University of Madrid and the European University of Madrid. His wife, Carmen Porter, is also a journalist and investigator on paranormal activity; both work together in the show Cuarto Milenio, in the TV network Cuatro, and its radio version Milenio 3 in Cadena SER, about paranormal activity, Ufology and other mysteries.

Switzerland 

 Billy Meier, (b. 1937)
 Erich von Däniken, (b. 1935), controversial Swiss author best known for his books which examine possible evidence for extraterrestrial influences on early human culture.
 Giorgio A. Tsoukalos, (b. 1978), probably best known for his work on Ancient Aliens and alien memes.

United Kingdom 

 Brinsley Le Poer Trench, (1911–1995), ufologist and a believer in flying saucers, and in particular, the Hollow Earth theory.
 Timothy Good (b. 1942), British researcher and author.
 Graham Hancock, (b. 1950), is a British writer and journalist. He is known for his pseudoscientific theories involving ancient civilisations, Earth changes, stone monuments or megaliths, altered states of consciousness, ancient myths, and astronomical or astrological data from the past.
 George King, (1919–1997) regarded himself as "Primary Terrestrial Mental Channel" for great and evolved extraterrestrial Intelligences.
 Elizabeth Klarer, (1910–1984), South African contactee and UFO photographer.
 Nick Pope, (b. 1965), Former head of the UFO desk, Ministry of Defence; author of Operation Thunder Child.
 Jenny Randles, (b. 1951), British author and former director of investigations with the British UFO Research Association (BUFORA).
 Nick Redfern (b. 1964), British ufologist/Cryptozoologist now living in Dallas, Texas, US.
 Peter A. Sturrock (b. 1924) British scientist. An emeritus professor of applied physics at Stanford University, much of Sturrock's career has been devoted to astrophysics, plasma physics, and solar physics, but Sturrock is interested in other fields, including ufology, scientific inference, the history of science, and the philosophy of science.
 Colin Wilson, (1931–2013), English philosopher and author of Alien Dawn (1999).

United States 

 George Adamski (April 17, 1891 – April 23, 1965), controversial UFO contactee and known hoaxer of the 1950s, wrote several bestselling books about his encounters with friendly "space brothers" from other planets.
 
 Orfeo Angelucci (aka Orville Angelucci) (June 25, 1912 – July 24, 1993), one of the most unusual of the mid-1950s UFO contactees.
 Art Bell (birth name: Arthur William Bell, III) (June 17, 1945 – April 13, 2018), U.S. radio broadcaster and author, known primarily as the founder and longtime host of the paranormal-themed radio program Coast to Coast AM.
 William J. Birnes, American writer, editor, book publisher and literary rights agent. He is best known as an active publisher of UFO literature (UFO Magazine) and is a New York Times bestselling author.
 Jerome Clark (b. 1946), UFO historian, author of the UFO Encyclopedia
 Philip J. Corso (1915–1998), Army Military Intelligence officer, wrote highly disputed book on Roswell incident.
 Robert Dean (March 2, 1929 – October 11, 2018), ufologist, reportedly read a document called An Assessment (1964), a NATO report on UFOs prompted by an incident on February 2, 1961 during which 50 UFOs allegedly appeared over Europe.
 Tom DeLonge (born 1975), former singer and guitarist of blink-182 and founder of To the Stars Academy of Arts and Sciences

 Glenn Dennis (March 24, 1925 – April 28, 2015), founder of the International UFO Museum and Research Center in Roswell, New Mexico, which opened in September 1991. Dennis is a self-professed witness to the Roswell incident (1947).
 Danielle Egnew (b. February 28, 1969), American Psychic / Medium and Paranormal Radio, TV and Film host. Contactee who regularly reports on first-hand communication with extraterrestrial species along with detailed physics / design of extraterrestrial propulsion systems.
 Raymond E. Fowler (b. 1934), long-time UFO investigator, details one of the best multiple witness alien abduction cases on record, author of The Andreasson Affair and The Allagash Abductions.
 James Fox, filmmaker responsible for The Phenomenon (2020) and Out of the Blue (2003).
 Daniel Fry (July 19, 1908 – December 20, 1992), American contactee who claimed he had multiple contacts with an alien and took a ride in a remotely piloted alien spacecraft on July 4, 1949.
 Allen H. Greenfield (b. 1946), American occultist, Ufologist, writer, editor.
 Steven M. Greer (b. 1955), American physician known as a proponent of openness in government, media and corporations when it comes to advanced technologies that he and others believe to have been shelved and hidden from public awareness for reasons of profit and influence.
 Richard H. Hall (December 25, 1930 – July 17, 2009), former assistant Director of NICAP in the 1960s, former director of the Fund for UFO Research in the 1980s.
 Charles I. Halt,(b. 1939)  retired USAF Colonel who was a key figure in the Rendlesham UFO incident in 1980.
 Allan Hendry (b. 1950), astronomer, full-time UFO investigator for the Center for UFO Studies in the late 1970s and early 1980s.
 Budd Hopkins (1931–2011), alien abduction researcher.
 J. Allen Hynek (May 1, 1910 – April 27, 1986), astronomer, consultant to Project Blue Book (USAF). Founded CUFOS (Center for UFO Studies).
 David M. Jacobs (b1942), alien abduction researcher.
 Morris K. Jessup (March 2 or 20, 1900 – April 20, 1959), photographer, is probably best remembered for his pioneering ufological writings and his role in uncovering the so-called Philadelphia Experiment.

 Leslie Kean - an investigative journalist and author who is most notable for books about UFOs and the afterlife.
 John Keel (birth name: Alva John Kiehle) (March 25, 1930 – July 3, 2009), journalist, investigated the famous Mothman Sightings in West Virginia in 1966 and 1967.
 Donald Keyhoe (June 20, 1897 – November 29, 1988), aviator and Marine Corps officer, was the leader of NICAP, the largest civilian UFO research group in the U.S., in the 1950s and 1960s.
 Philip J. Klass (November 8, 1919 – August 9, 2005), senior editor of Aviation Week and Space Technology, leading UFO skeptic/debunker from mid-1960s until his death in 2005.
 George Knapp (b. 1952), American investigative journalist.
 Kevin H. Knuth, associate professor of physics at University at Albany, editor-in-chief of Entropy scientific journal, author of "Estimating Flight Characteristics of Anomalous Unidentified Aerial Vehicles" - scientific paper based on US Navy personnel UFO observations
 Bob Lazar (b. 1959), owner of a mail-order scientific supply company who claims to have worked from 1988 until 1989 at an area called S-4 (Sector Four).
 Avi Loeb (b. 1962) is an Israeli-American theoretical physicist who works on astrophysics and cosmology, Professor of Science at Harvard University. In 2018, he attracted media attention for suggesting that alien space craft may be in our solar system, using the anomalous behavior of ʻOumuamua as an example. He also claims that UFO needs serious scientific study, as part of SETI research
 Bruce Maccabee (b. 1942), retired US Navy optical physicist, has analyzed numerous UFO videos and photos.
 John E. Mack (1929–2004), Harvard psychiatrist/professor, alien abduction researcher.
 James E. McDonald (1920-1971) Physicist and professor of meteorology at the University of Arizona. Noted critic of the Condon Report. 
 Jim Marrs (December 5, 1943 – August 2, 2017), conspiracy theorist, news reporter, college professor, and author of books and articles on a wide range of assorted conspiracy theories.
 Riley Martin (May 9, 1946 – December 2015), self-described alien contactee, author, and radio host.
 Donald Howard Menzel (1901–1976), professor of astronomy at Harvard University, leading UFO skeptic of the 1950s and 1960s.
 James W. Moseley (1931–2012), editor of Saucer Smear, long-time observer, author and commentator of the UFO phenomena.
 Linda Moulton Howe (b. 1942), journalist known for investigating cattle mutilations.
 George Noory (b. 1950), broadcaster of the popular "Coast to Coast" radio broadcast; the program discusses paranormal events.
 Curtis Peebles, aerospace historian for the Smithsonian Institution, also a leading UFO skeptic.
 Kevin D. Randle (b. 1949), captain in the US Air Force Reserves; also a leading investigator of the Roswell incident in 1947.
 Edward J. Ruppelt (July 17, 1923 – September 15, 1960), Air Force captain who supervised Project Blue Book, the Air Force's official study of the UFO phenomenon in the 1950s and 1960s.
 Harley Rutledge (1926–2006), solid-state physicist, Southeast Missouri State University.
 Robert Sheaffer (b. 1949), member of CSICOP's UFO subcommittee, a leading UFO skeptic/debunker.
 Whitley Strieber (b. 1946), author of Communion, UFO researcher, paranormal phenomena expert, and alleged abductee.
 Leonard H. Stringfield, (1920–1994), American ufologist who took particular interest in crashed flying saucer stories.
 Michael D. Swords, biophysicist at Western Michigan University, prominent ufologist for the Center for UFO Studies.

See also 
 Hermann Oberth (physicist, rocketry pioneer)
 Wernher von Braun

References

External links

UFO-related lists